Haimbachia arizonensis is a moth in the family Crambidae. It was described by Hahn William Capps in 1965. It is found in North America, where it has been recorded from Arizona.

The length of the forewings is 7-7.5 mm. Adults have been recorded on wing in August.

References

Haimbachiini
Moths described in 1965